HEPBS (N-(2-Hydroxyethyl)piperazine-N'-(4-butanesulfonic acid)) is a zwitterionic organic chemical buffering agent; one of Good's buffers. HEPBS and HEPES have very similar structures and properties, HEPBS also having an acidity (pKa) in the physiological range (7.6-9.0 useful range). This makes it possible to use it for cell culture work.

References 

Zwitterions
Piperazines
Ethanolamines
Sulfonic acids
Buffer solutions